The Club Hawkeye is an American football team located in Minoh, Osaka, Japan.  They are a member of the X-League.

Seasons

References

External links
  (Japanese)

American football in Japan
1989 establishments in Japan
American football teams established in 1989